Tarn Taran Assembly constituency is one of the 117 Legislative Assembly constituencies of Punjab state in India. It is located in the Tarn Taran district. Kashmir Singh Sohal from Aam Aadmi Party is the MLA from Tarn Taran, elected in 2022 Punjab Legislative Assembly election.

Members of the Legislative Assembly

Election results

2022

2017

See also
 List of constituencies of the Punjab Legislative Assembly
 Tarn Taran district

References

External links
  

Assembly constituencies of Punjab, India
Tarn Taran district